San Gregorio de Polanco is a small city in the Tacuarembó Department of northern-central Uruguay.

Geography
Route 43 passes across the lake to Durazno Department by ferryboat.

History
It was founded on 27 November 1853. On 13 October 1963, its status was elevated to "Villa" (town) by the Act of Ley Nº 13.167, and then on 13 December 1994 to "Ciudad" (city) by the Act of Ley Nº 16.666.

In 1945, the artificial lake of Rincon del Bonete hugely changed the landscape of this town, adding a water surface and, later, beaches.

Population
In 2011, San Gregorio de Polanco had a population of 3,415.
 
Source: Instituto Nacional de Estadística de Uruguay

Places of worship
 Parish Church of Our Lady of Mt. Carmel

References

External links
INE map of San Gregorio de Polanco

Populated places in the Tacuarembó Department